Charles-Eugène Quinquaud (26 December 1841, Lafat – 9 January 1894, Paris) was a French internist and dermatologist.

He studied medicine in Limoges and Paris, receiving his doctorate in 1873.  While working as a hospital interne, he was influenced by Pierre-Antoine-Ernest Bazin to study dermatology. In 1878 he became médecin des hôpitaux, obtained his agrégation in 1883, and from 1886 served as chef de service at the Hôpital Saint-Louis in Paris.  During his career, he worked closely with dermatologists Ernest Besnier, Jean Alfred Fournier and Émile Vidal.  In 1892 he was elected as a member of the Académie de Médecine.

In 1888 he described folliculitis decalvans, a scalp disease sometimes referred to as "Quinquaud’s disease".  His name is also associated with "Quinquaud's sign", a form of finger tremor with a sideways finger movement from the interossei.  The phenomenon was first described in alcoholics, and its description was first published by a student of Quinquaud's, six years after his death.

In 1882, with physiologist Nestor Gréhant, he developed a method for determining blood volume through the use of carbon monoxide.

Selected writings 
 Étude sur les affections articulaires (first fascicle), 1876.
 Mesure de la quantité de sang contenu dans l'organisme d'un mammifère vivant (with Nestor Gréhant), 1882.
 Traité technique de chimie biologique, 1883.
 De la scrofule dans ses rapports avec la phtisie pulmonaire, 1883.
 Folliculite épilate décalvante. Réunions clin. Hôpital St. Louis, Comptes rendus. Paris, 1888-1889, 9: 17.
 Folliculite destructive des régions velues. Bulletins et memoires de la Société medicale des hôpitaux de Paris, 1888, 5: 95-98.
 Études de thérapeutique expérimentale et clinique, 1892.

See also 

 Anna Quinquaud

References 

1841 births
1894 deaths
French dermatologists
French internists
People from Creuse
19th-century French physicians